Jean Alexandre Germain Zizine (3 August 1922 – 12 July 1986) was a French field hockey player. He competed in the men's tournament at the 1952 Summer Olympics.

References

External links
 

1922 births
1986 deaths
French male field hockey players
Olympic field hockey players of France
Field hockey players at the 1952 Summer Olympics